The Amazing Race Norge 2 is the second season of the Norwegian reality television series The Amazing Race Norge.

The show premiered 6 March 2013 at 20:00 (CEST). The finale aired on 22 May, and a special highlights episode aired on 29 May.

Brothers Omar and Bilal Ishqair were the winners of this season.

Production

Development and filming

On 18 August 2012, it was confirmed that Freddy dos Santos would return to present the show. Filming took place from November to December 2012. In this season, if there are two or more teams arriving at the Pit Stop at the same time, though they were not given a tied position, all those teams would depart together at the same time in the next leg, unlike the American version. This case occurred in Leg 2, where the 2nd, 3rd and 4th teams departing at the same time, as well as the 7th and 8th teams. This season also introduced the variant of the Intersection that was also in the second Latin American season, where two teams compete against each other, with the first team winning getting their next clue and the losing team waiting at for another team to redo the challenge, and if the team was the last at the Intersection, they would wait out a penalty.

Casting
The show began casting on 1 July. with participants required to be at least 18 years old to join. Applications closed on 15 August, and the cast was revealed on 20 November 2012.

Marketing
The sponsors include Nordea, Hotels.com, Elproffen, Gouda and Subaru.

Cast

Results
The following teams participated in the season, with their relationships at the time of filming. Note that this table is not necessarily reflective of all content broadcast on television due to inclusion or exclusion of some data. Placements are listed in finishing order:

Key
A  team placement indicates that the team was eliminated.
An  team placement indicates that the team came in last on a non-elimination leg and were penalised with a Handicap (Handikap) in the next leg.
A  means the team chose to use a U-Turn;  indicates the team who received it.
 An  indicates that there was an Intersection in that leg, while an  indicates which team lost the Intersection task and received a penalty.
An underlined leg number indicates that there was no mandatory rest period at the Pit Stop and all teams were ordered to continue racing, except for the last team to arrive, who was eliminated. The first place team was still awarded a prize for that leg.
Notes

 Allan & Ørjan were not shown performing the Roadblock and were simply shown checking into the Pit Stop. It is unknown who performed the Roadblock on Leg 1.

Prizes
Individual prizes were awarded to the first team to complete certain legs.
 
Leg 5 –  gift certificate from Hotels.com
Leg 6 –  gift certificate from Hotels.com
Leg 9 –  gift certificate from Hotels.com
Leg 10 –  gift certificate from Hotels.com
Leg 12 –  from Nordea and a Subaru Forester for each team member.

Race summary

Leg 1 (Norway → South Africa)

Airdate: 6 March 2013
Oslo, Norway (Bygdøy – Maritime Statue) (Starting Line)
Oslo (Fram Museum)
Oslo (Sentrum – Parking House)
Oslo (Karl Johans Gate)
Oslo (Nobel Peace Center)
 Oslo (Oslo Airport, Gardermoen) to Cape Town, South Africa (Cape Town International Airport)
Cape Town (Victoria & Alfred Waterfront – Nobel Square)
Cape Town (Langa Township – Simons Curio)
Cape Town (Short Market Street – Heritage Square)
Cape Town (Castle of Good Hope)   

In this season's first Roadblock, one team member had to use a set of keys that would open a room at the Castle of Good Hope containing their next clue.

Additional tasks
At the Fram Museum, teams had to search for one of ten clues on the Fram, used by the Norwegian explorer Fridtjof Nansen.
On Karl Johans gate, teams had to find a man named Jan Egil and buy a magazine from him which would lead them to their next destination: the Nobel Peace Center.
At Oslo Airport, teams had to search for a board where they had to put their picture on it in order of arrival before they get their tickets.
At Cape Town International Airport, teams had to search for a man named Shiraz, who would give them their next clue depending on the order that they arrived at Gardermoen. Each team left five minutes after the one before them.
At Nobel Square teams had to take a 6 question quiz about South African Nobel Prize winners. When they had the correct answers, the first letters would make the word ubuntu which is an ethical worldview from Africa that emphasizes community, sharing and generosity. When they got the right word, they could say it in exchange for their next clue.
At Langa Township, teams had to learn and perform a local dance called the "gumboot dance" to the satisfaction of their instructor to receive the next clue.
In Heritage Square, teams had to buy a postcard with a note from the host. The note told them to go to the place on the postcard: the Castle of Good Hope.

Leg 2 (South Africa)

Airdate: 13 March 2013
Cape Town (Table Mountain) (Pit Start)
Cape Town (Muizenberg Beach) 
Cape Town (Kalk Bay Harbour) 
Cape Town (Masiphumelele – Parking)
 Cape Town (Masiphumelele – Masiphumelele Cellphone & Take-Away)
Cape Town (Chapman's Peak) 

In this leg's Roadblock, one team member had to recreate three beach houses using wooden puzzle pieces to receive their next clue. They could only construct the beach house matching the three numbers given to them.

This season's first Detour was a choice between Telle (Count) or Pelle. In Telle, teams had to count two different kinds of fish submerged in a container full of ice (13 black and 17 red) to receive their next clue. In Pelle, teams had to string fish up for sale to receive their next clue.

Additional tasks
Atop Table Mountain, teams had to find and photograph four different kinds of flowers using a tablet to receive their next clue.
At Kalk Beach Harbour, teams had to search for Ferial who would give them their next clue.
At Masiphumele, teams had to ride bicycles and find the Masiphumele Cellphone & Take-away store. Once there, teams had to deliver the sheep's head they had brought with them throughout the leg and eat one cooked head each before being given their next clue.
At Chapman's Peak, teams had to fire a cannon before checking into the Pit Stop.

Leg 3 (South Africa → Namibia)

Airdate: 20 March 2013
Cape Town (Street) (Pit Start)
 Cape Town (Cape Town International Airport) to Windhoek, Namibia (Hosea Kutako International Airport)
Hoffnung (Tau Taxidermy)
Windhoek (Katutura – Etyapa Tyre Repair)
Windhoek (Katutura – Oshetu Community Open Market) 
 Windhoek (Tangeni Car Wash or Matteus' Woodchopping)
Khomas Region (Okapuka Game Reserve)
Otjozondjupa Region (Otjihavara Railway Station)  

This leg's Detour was a choice between Hugge (Scrap) or Skrubbe (Scrub). In Hugge, teams had chop pieces of wood to receive their next clue. In Skrubbe, teams had to wash and scrub cars to receive their next clue.

In this leg's Roadblock one team member had to play bokdrool by spitting a dung pellet and placing a stick where it landed. Then, they would have to spit another pellet, pick up the stick and repeat the cycle until they reached the Pit Stop.

Additional tasks
At Cape Town International Airport, teams had to find a statue of an elephant where they would place their picture on a board, which would be used for their first task in Windhoek.
At Tau Taxidermy, teams needed to identify a series of skins to the animal it belonged to. The number of skins the teams had to identify was based on the order in which they arrived at Cape Town International Airport. The first three teams (Eva & Wenche, Julie & Robert, Solfrid & Sveinung) had to only identify two skins. The next two (Cecille & Camilia, Vinh & Terje) had to identify four skins and the last three (Omar & Bilal, Lill & Stian, Priscila & Lindsy) had to identify six animals skins.
At the Etyapa Tyre Repair, teams needed to buy a tyre and separate the rim from the hub of the wheel. After, teams had to bring the wheel to a nearby shop where they would be given cut-up tyre pieces to make sandals with. After making the sandals, they would have to wear them and walk to the Oshetu Community Open Market where they would get their next clue.
While travelling through the Okapuka Game Reserve, teams had to gather animal droppings before continuing to the Otjihavara Railway Station. They would need these droppings for their Roadblock.

Leg 4 (Namibia)

Airdate: 27 March 2013
 Otjozondjupa Region (Otjihavara Railway Station) to Erongo Region (Stingbank Railway Siding) (Pit Start)
Spitzkoppe (Store)
 Spitzkoppe (Spitzkoppe Primary School)
Spitzkoppe (Bushman Paradise)
Spitzkoppe (Small Bushman Paradise)
Erongo Region (Khan River)
Erongo Region (Haigamkab) 
Moonscape Canyon (Viewpoint)
Moonscape Canyon 

In this leg's Roadblock, one team member had to learn from schoolchildren five words in the local San language of the pictures on the cloths given to at the store. After reciting the words correctly, a schoolteacher would give them their next clue.

This leg's Detour was a choice between Spare Vann (Save Water) or Koke Vann (Boiling Water). In Spare Vann, teams had to learn how water was traditionally kept by the San. First they had to draw water underground using a straw bored into the ground and then transfer the water to the ostrich eggs that they gathered at the Khan River. After filling the eggs with water, teams had to cover the hole in the eggs using straw and bury them underground to receive their next clue. In Koke Vann, teams had to start a fire using sticks and boil water. They then had to transfer their water to the ostrich eggs they had gathered previously to receive their next clue.

Additional tasks
Upon being released from the train, teams found that they had to attach a tire to the pickup truck they would use.
At the store in Spitzkoppe, teams were given pieces of cloth along with their next clue.
After hiking up the Spitzkoppe to Bushman Paradise, teams were taught by a bushman how to make the paint used in rock paintings. If their paint was satisfactory, he would give them their next clue.
After the paint task, teams had to walk on the mountain to Small Bushman Paradise, where they would find their next clue in their vehicle.
At the Khan River, teams had to gather two ostrich eggs hidden around the area that they would need these for both Detour choices. When they found the eggs, they had to drive to Haigamkab to retrieve their next clue.
Before checking into the Pit Stop, teams had to find a clue envelope hidden underneath hundreds of blankets all over Moonscape Canyon. Teams had to carry any blanket they picked up. When they found a clue, they could proceed to the Pit Stop.

Additional note
During the Pit Stop, teams were transported by TransNamib train to the Namib Desert. They disembarked at different points during the ride in the order they arrived at the previous Pit Stop.

Leg 5 (Namibia → Chile)

Airdate: 3 April 2013
 Windhoek (Hosea Kutako International Airport) to Santiago, Chile (Arturo Merino Benítez International Airport)
 Pudahuel (Arturo Merino Benítez International Airport) to Santiago (Palacio de La Moneda)
Santiago (Plaza de la Constitución)
 Santiago (Paseo Ahumada)
Santiago (Santa Lucía Hill)
Santiago (Cerro Calán  – National Astronomical Observatory) 
 Santiago (Mall Sport)
Santiago (Parque Forestal)
Santiago (Parque Forestal – Museo Nacional de Bellas Artes) 

In this leg's Roadblock, one team member had to stand behind a kiosk and shake  of nuts and prepare them for sale to the satisfaction of the vendor to receive their next clue.

This leg's Detour was a choice between Henge Høyt (Hanging High) or Stable Drøyt (Rough Stability). In Henge Høyt, both team member had to complete an aerial obstacle course to receive their next clue. In Stable Drøyt, teams had to stack two pyramids of golf balls to receive next clue.

Additional tasks
At Hosea Kutako International Airport, teams had to place their picture on a board in the order of their arrival. 
Upon arrival in Santiago, teams had to locate Fernandes, who would give them their next clue and would escort teams to their bus that would take them to La Moneda Palace. Teams were given their next clue ten minutes apart from each other in the order of their arrival at Hosea Kutako International Airport. Omar & Bilal departed first; Julie & Robert, second; Cecilie & Camillia, third; Solfrid & Sveinung, fourth; Eva & Wenche, fifth; Lill Marie & Stian, sixth; Vinh & Terje, last, 60 minutes after the first team.
At La Moneda, teams had to figure out that their next clue was on a message being flashed on a screen at the nearby Torre Entel. This message instructed teams to search behind the Presidential Palace to find their next clue at Plaza de la Constitución.
At Santa Lucía Hill, teams had to search for a Roman numeral-numbered cannonball near the hill's six cannons and carry them all the way to the top of the hill to receive their next clue.
At the National Astronomical Observatory, teams had to memorize the astrological signs of the Zodiac. Once they think they have memorized the symbols, they may proceed to the observatory where they would need to match the symbols with the name of the Zodiac to receive their next clue. For Vinh & Terje's Handicap, they not only had to memorize the symbols but they also needed to know the names and their correct sequencing.
At Parque Forestal, each team member had to successfully play with a traditional Chilean toy called Emboque. It consists of a stick and small knob with a hole attached to the stick by a string. The main goal of the game is to get the knob off the stick, flip, and back onto the stick. If both team members were successful, they would get their next clue and could run to the Pit Stop.

Leg 6 (Chile)

Airdate: 10 April 2013
 Santiago (Terminal Alameda ) to Valparaíso
Valparaíso (The Old Train)
Valparaíso (Caleta Portales ) 
Viña del Mar (Sundial)
 Valparaíso (Parque Cultural de Valparaíso )
Valparaíso (Pasaje L. Bavestrello)
Valparaíso (Paseo Yugoslavo)  

This leg's Detour was a choice between Klatre (Climb) or Klatte (Daub). In Klatre, one team member had to perform an acrobatic exercise, while the other team member had to climb  on a rope to receive their next clue. In Klatte, teams had to color a painting using the paint by number system to receive their next clue.

In this leg's Roadblock, one team member had to learn to correctly play the chorus of "El Cóndor Pasa" on a pan flute before their team could proceed to the Pit Stop.

Additional tasks
At the Old Train, teams had to search inside the train for a picture of Freddy holding a sign with the name of the next destination.
At Caleta Portales, teams had to eat a piure to receive their next clue. For their Handicap, Lill & Stan had to eat two piure.
At the sundial in Viña del Mar, teams had to walk a lap around the dial in exactly 60 seconds without using a clock as aid to receive their next clue.

Leg 7 (Chile → Argentina)

Airdate: 17 April 2013
 Valparaíso (Intersection of Avenida Brazil & Edward Street) to San Esteban (Vineyard) 
San Esteban (Casa e`Campo Restaurant)
Valparaíso Region (Portillo Hotel)
Valparaíso Region (Laguna del Inca)
Mendoza Province, Argentina (Borderline) 
Mendoza Province (Aconcagua Provincial Park) 

In this leg's Roadblock, one team member had to make wine by mixing Cabernet Sauvignon (65%), Petit Verdot (30%) and Carménère (5%). When the mixture was approved by the taste-tasters, racers had to pour the wine poured into a bottle, seal the stopper with wax and label the bottle to receive their next clue from a winemaker.

This leg's Detour was a choice between Opptur (Upturn) or Nedtur (Downturn). In Opptur, teams had to carry a  sack to a climber, sitting 120 meters above where the teams started to get the next clue. In Nedtur, teams ascended  to grab a rope, and had to supply the rope for the climber to get the next clue

Additional tasks
After teams finished the Roadblock, they had to deliver the wine to the restaurant owner Gino to get the key to the next clue.
Inside the Portillo Hotel, teams had to deliver two shirts to room 629, then teams had to fetch bread from the bakery and finally had to deliver two drinks from the bar to the couple on the balcony. After the teams had done the tasks, they had to search with binoculars for the next clue.
The teams had to paddle a kayak from Laguna del Inca and back to Portillo Hotel.
Before checking into the Pit Stop, teams had to load supplies onto mules. When the pack was approved, they had to go with the mule to the Pit Stop.

Leg 8 (Argentina)

Airdate: 24 April 2013
Uribelarrea, Pampas Region (Uribelarrea Train Station )
Uribelarrea (La Pulperia)
Uribelarrea (En Palenque)
Uribelarrea (Don Boscos)
Uribelarrea (Esculea Agrotecnica Salesiana)
Uribelarrea (Avenida Estancia La Figura) 
Uribelarrea (Avenida Estancia La Figura – BBQ)  
Uribelarrea (Avenida Estancia La Figura – Field) 
Uribelarrea (Avenida Estancia La Figura – Ranch Garden) 

For this series' first Intersection, teams had to compete against each other in a traditional gaucho challenge. First, one team member must ride a horse consisting of barrel racing and back. Then, the second team member had to ride the same course, and then using a stick, spearing a ring at the end of the course. First team to catch the ring, would receive their next clue.

This leg's Detour was a choice between Mat (Food) or Innmat (Guts). In Mat, teams had to eat  beef to receive their nect clue. In Innmat, teams had to eat  guts from ox to receive their next clue.

In this leg's Roadblock,  one team member had to choose a station and use a lasso to rope a wooden horse and pull it towards them to receive their next clue.

Additional tasks
At La Pulperia, teams had to buy a calabash gourd, a bombilla and a bag of yerba mate. Once bought, they had to deliver it to a group of gauchos outside En Palenque. There, they had to mix yerba mate with water, and drink it in a traditional way to receive their next clue. 
At Don Boscos, teams had to separate 10 red marked cows from a group of cows, and move them to a pen to receive their next clue. 
At Esculea Agrotecnica Salesiana, teams had to find the feeding station. There, they had to fill up bags of animal food. With horse, teams had to transport the food to Avenida Estancia La Figura, where they had to weigh in the food.

Leg 9 (Argentina)

Airdate: 1 May 2013
 Buenos Aires (Devoto Station to Retiro Railway Station)
Buenos Aires (Avenida 9 de Julio – Building of Eva Perón)
Buenos Aires (Libertador Bookstore)
Buenos Aires (Confitería Ideal ) 
Buenos Aires (Simo Confiteria)  
Buenos Aires (Avenida Corrientes – Newspaper Store)
Buenos Aires (Plaza San Martín)
Buenos Aires (Gobierno de la Ciudad de Buenos Aires ) 

In this leg's Roadblock, one team member had to choose a dance instructor and learn the basic steps of Argentine tango. Then they had to choose a dancing partner and dance for two minutes to the satisfaction of the judge to receive their next clue.

This leg's Detour was a choice between Gull i munn (Gold inside the mouth) or Sølv i bunn (Silver at the bottom). In Gull i munn, teams had to bake 50 croissants. When the baker was satisfied with the quality, they would receive their next clue. In Sølv i bunn, teams had to sell 50 croissants for $2 per croissant. When the teams had earned $100, they would receive their next clue. For their Handicap, Lill & Stian had to sell 100 croissants and earn $200 to receive their next clue.

Additional tasks
At Libertador Bookstore, teams had to search for the book Buenos Aires Baila Tango. Guia de Milongas. Once they found it, they had to flip to page 97 to find the address to their next destination.
At the newspaper store on Avenida Corrientes, teams had to put together 50 copies of the newspaper Clarín to receive their next clue.
At Plaza San Martin, teams had to take on the job of dog walking. They had to walk ten dogs with same colour on their collar to Gobierno de la Ciudad de Buenos Aires to receive their next clue.

Leg 10 (Argentina)

Airdate: 8 May 2013
 Buenos Aires (Aeroparque Jorge Newbery) to Puerto Iguazú (Cataratas del Iguazú International Airport)
Puerto Iguazú (Boat Dock)
Iguazú National Park (Granja de Ceros)
Iguazú National Park (Guarani Jefe) 
Iguazú National Park (Base del Ejército Argentino) 
Iguazú National Park (Iguazu Falls – Lower Trail Lookout) 

This leg's Detour was a choice between Høste (Harvest) or Nøste (Wind it). In Høste, teams had to harvest and clean  of corn to receive their next clue.

In this leg's Roadblock, one team member had to complete a military obstacle course to receive their next clue.

Additional tasks
Outside the airport in Puerto Iguazú, teams had to draw off a map in the same order as they arrived at the airport in Buenos Aires. These maps, teams had to use the rest of the leg. When teams was finished drawing off the map, they received their next clue.  
In Granja de Ceros, teams had to catch a pig, put it in a bag and deliver it to the village chief in the neighbouring village of Guarani Jefe to receive their next clue. 
After the Detour, teams had to choose a guide that would lead them to an Argentine military base camp.

Leg 11 (Argentina → Brazil)

Airdate: 15 May 2013
Foz do Iguaçu, Brazil (Itaipu Dam) (Pit Start)
 Foz do Iguaçu (Foz do Iguaçu International Airport) to Rio de Janeiro (Santos Dumont Airport)
Rio de Janeiro (Escadaria Selarón)  
Niterói (Karanba Football Club) 
 Niterói (Praça Araribóia) to Rio de Janeiro (Praça XV)
Rio de Janeiro (Copacabana Beach)  
Rio de Janeiro (Ipanema Beach – Pier 8)
Rio de Janeiro (Ipanema Beach – Pier 7)
Rio de Janeiro (Arpoador Park) 

In this leg's Roadblock, one team member had to search for 10 pictured tiles on Escadaria Selaón. When they had found the tiles, they had to write down certain letters, in order to get a code phrase. When they had found out the code phrase (Cesar, cadê minha pista?), they would receive their next clue. For their Handicap, Cecilie & Camilla had to find 15 tiles. 

For this season's final Intersection, one team had to play a 10-minute football match against another team. First, teams had to choose three Karanba-players, so it was a five-on-five match. The winning team got their next clue and the losing team had to wait for another couple to arrive to play against them. 

This season's final Detour was a choice between Nett (Net) or Svett (Sweat). In Nett, teams had to clean and hang up a fishing net. When the fisherman was satisfied with the work, the fisherman would point out the direction to their next clue. In Svett, teams had to learn a Capoeira-dance, and had to perform it in front of a judge. When the judge was satisfied with the performance, the judge would point out the direction to their next clue.

Additional tasks
At Santos Dumont Airport, team had to collect trolleys to receive their next clue. Since Omar & Bilal came in 1st place in the previous leg, they had to collect 5 trolleys. Julie & Robert had to collect 10 trolleys, Solfrid & Sveinung 15 trolleys and Cecilie & Camilla 20 trolleys.
After the Roadblock, teams had to find one of four white VW-buses. When they had found one, they had to say "Karanba" to the driver, that the driver would drive them to their next destination. 
At Copacabana Beach, teams had to find their next clue, that was hidden inside a sandcastle.
At Pier 8 on Ipanema Beach, teams had to calculate how much ice would melt in an 800-meters (1/2 mile) walk. They had to deliver ice to a judge at Pier 7. There the ice had to be weighed in at exactly 20 kg (44 lb), for the teams could proceed to Pit Stop. If the ice was weighed in at more or less than 20 kg (44 lb), they had to redo the task.

Leg 12 (Brazil → Norway)

Airdate: 22 May 2013
Rio de Janeiro (Leblon Beach)
 Rio de Janeiro (Rio de Janeiro/Galeão International Airport) to Oslo, Norway (Oslo Airport, Gardermoen)
 Ullensaker, Akershus (Oslo Airport Station) to Drammen, Buskerud (Drammen Station)
Kongsberg (Magasinparken)
 Kongsberg (Jonas B. Gundersen Jazzkjøkken)
Kongsberg (FMC Technologies)
Kongsberg (The Crowns in Håvet)
Kongsberg (Kongsberg Skisenter)
Saggrenda (Kongsberg Silver Mines – The King's Mine) 

In this season's final Roadblock, one team member had to learn Kongsberg Drikkevise and perform it to the satisfaction of the judge to receive their next clue.

Additional tasks
At Leblon Beach, teams had to swim out to a buoy and retrieve their picture. Then they had to swim back and place their picture on a board which would be used for their first task in Norway.
In Drammen, teams had to find one of three cars that was parked in three different locations in Drammen. The order teams got on the board in Rio de Janeiro, decided how far from the train station in Drammen their car was parked. Solfrid & Sveinung's car was parked 350 meters away from the train station, Omar & Bilal 990 meters away, and Cecilie & Camilla 1,400 meters away.
At FMC Technologies, teams had to build a model of a subsea pipe coupling for oil and gas. The instructions was written in Portuguese, so they had to find one person that could translate the instruction. Once the coupling was done and approved, they would receive their next clue.
At FMC Technologies, teams had to navigate a subsea robot to retrieve their next clue, which was  under water.
At Kongsberg Skisenter, teams had to go Telemark skiing down a black run-hill to receive their next clue. 
Outside the King's Mine, teams had to use hammer and chisel to retrieve their next clue, that was inside a concrete block.
Inside the King's Mine, teams had to fence against a former national champion and score one point to receive their next clue. 
In front of the Finish Line, teams had to find the right combination of the numbers 2-6-7-8 to open up a safe with their final clue inside. If they typed the wrong combination five times, they had to wait out 5 minutes before they could try again. When the right combination was typed in (8-2-7-6), they could open the safe, retrieve their next clue and run to the Finish Line.

References

External links
  
 

Norge 2
2013 Norwegian television seasons
Television shows filmed in Norway
Television shows filmed in South Africa
Television shows filmed in Namibia
Television shows filmed in Chile
Television shows filmed in Argentina
Television shows filmed in Brazil